Tuulikki is a Finnish female given name. The nameday is the 22nd of February. As of May 2015 there were close to 74,300 people with this name in Finland. In Finnish mythology, Tuulikki was the name of a Finnish forest goddess, the daughter of Tapio and Mielikki.

Notable people
Some people who have this name include:
 Tuulikki Laesson, an Estonian chess player
 Tuulikki Pietilä, a Finnish artist
 Tuulikki Pyykkönen, a Finnish athlete

References 

Finnish feminine given names